This is a list of the squads picked for the 2010 ICC Under-19 Cricket World Cup.

Group A

Coach:

Coach:  Mark Robinson

Coach:  Afzaal Haider

Coach:  Chandrakant Pandit

Group B

Coach:  Brian McFadyen

Coach:  Matt Dwyer

Coach:  Ray Jennings

Coach:

Group C

Coach:  Wilfred Plummer

Coach:  Chris Kuggeleijn

Coach:

Coach:  Kevin Curran

Group D

Coach:  Minhajul Abedin

Coach:

Coach:  Andy Bichel

Coach:

References and notes

ICC Under-19 Cricket World Cup squads
2010 in cricket
2010 ICC Under-19 Cricket World Cup